Arbitration, in the context of the law of the United States, is a form of alternative dispute resolution. Specifically, arbitration is an alternative to litigation through which the parties to a dispute agree to submit their respective evidence and legal arguments to a neutral third party (the arbitrator(s) or arbiter(s)) for resolution. In practice arbitration is generally used as a substitute for litigation, particularly when the judicial process is perceived as too slow, expensive or biased. In some contexts, an arbitrator may be described as an umpire.

Arbitration in the United States' most overarching clause is the Federal Arbitration Act (officially the United States Arbitration Act of 1925). The Act stipulates that arbitration in a majority of instances is legal when both parties, either after or prior to the arising of a dispute, agree to the arbitration. The Supreme Court has taken a pro-arbitration stance across most but not all cases, and the federal government, most recently in 2022, has passed certain exemptions to arbitration agreements. States are also generally prohibited from passing their own laws which the Supreme Court and other federal courts believe limit or discriminate against arbitration. The practice of arbitration, especially "forced" arbitration clauses between workers/consumers and large companies or organizations, has been gaining a growing amount of scrutiny from both the general public and trial lawyers.

History
Agreements to arbitrate were not enforceable at common law. This rule has been traced back to dictum by Lord Coke in Vynor’s Case, 8 Co. Rep. 81b, 77 Eng. Rep. 597 (1609), that agreements to arbitrate were revocable by either party.

During the Industrial Revolution, merchants became increasingly opposed to this rule. They argued that too many valuable business relationships were being destroyed through years of expensive adversarial litigation, in courts whose rules differed significantly from the informal norms and conventions of businesspeople. Arbitration was promoted as being faster, less adversarial, and cheaper.

The result was the New York Arbitration Act of 1920, followed by the United States Arbitration Act of 1925 (now known as the Federal Arbitration Act). Both made agreements to arbitrate valid and enforceable (unless one party could show fraud or unconscionability or some other ground for rescission which undermined the validity of the entire contract). Due to the subsequent judicial expansion of the meaning of interstate commerce, the Supreme Court reinterpreted the FAA in a series of cases in the 1980s and 1990s to cover almost the full scope of interstate commerce. In the process, the Court held that the FAA preempted many state laws covering arbitration, some of which had been passed by state legislatures to protect their workers and consumers against powerful business interestes.

Types of Arbitration

Commercial and other forms of contract arbitration

Since commercial arbitration is based upon either contract law or the law of treaties, the agreement between the parties to submit their dispute to arbitration is a legally binding contract. All arbitral decisions are considered to be "final and binding". This does not, however, void the requirements of law. Any dispute not excluded from arbitration by virtue of law (for example, criminal proceedings) may be submitted to arbitration.

Furthermore, arbitration agreements can only bind parties who have agreed, expressly or impliedly, to arbitrate, and parties cannot be required to submit to an arbitration process if they have not previously "agreed so to submit". It is only through the advance agreement of the parties that the arbitrator derives [any] authority to resolve disputes. Arbitration cannot bind non-signatories to an arbitration contract, even if those non-signatories later become involved with a signatory to a contract by accident (usually through the commission of a tort). However, third-party non-signatories can be bound by arbitration agreements based on theories of estoppel, agency relationships with a party, assumption of the contract containing the arbitration agreement, third-party beneficiary status under the contract, or piercing the corporate veil.

The question of whether two parties have actually agreed to arbitrate any disputes is one for judicial determination, because if the parties have not agreed to arbitrate then the arbitrator would have no authority. Where there is an arbitration agreement, doubts concerning "the scope of arbitrable issues should be resolved in favor of arbitration", but issues regarding whether a claim falls within the scope of arbitrable issues is a judicial matter, unless the parties have expressly agreed that the arbitrator may decide the scope of his or her own authority. Most courts hold that general arbitration clauses, such as an agreement to refer to arbitration any dispute "arising from" or "related to" a particular contract, do not authorize an arbitrator to determine whether a particular issue arises from or relates to the contract concerned. A minority view embraced by some courts is that this broad language can evidence the parties' clear and unmistakable intention to delegate the resolution of all issues to the arbitrator, including issues regarding arbitrability.

Labor arbitration
Arbitration may be used as a means of resolving labor disputes, an alternative to strikes and lockouts. Labor arbitration comes in two varieties:
interest arbitration, which provides a method for resolving disputes about the terms to be included in a new contract when the parties are unable to agree, and
grievance arbitration, which provides a method for resolving disputes over the interpretation and application of a collective bargaining agreement.

Arbitration has also been used as a means of resolving labor disputes for more than a century. Labor organizations in the United States, such as the National Labor Union, called for arbitration as early as 1866 as an alternative to strikes to resolve disputes over the wages, benefits and other rights that workers would enjoy.

Interest arbitration
Governments have relied on arbitration to resolve particularly large labor disputes, such as the Coal Strike of 1902. This type of arbitration, wherein a neutral arbitrator decides the terms of the collective bargaining agreement, is commonly known as interest arbitration. The United Steelworkers of America adopted an elaborate form of interest arbitration, known as the Experimental Negotiating Agreement, in the 1970s as a means of avoiding the long and costly strikes that had made the industry vulnerable to foreign competition. Major League Baseball uses a variant of interest arbitration, in which an arbitrator chooses between the two sides' final offers, to set the terms for contracts for players who are not eligible for free agency. Interest arbitration is now most frequently used by public employees who have no right to strike (for example, law enforcement and firefighters).

Grievance arbitration
Unions and employers have also employed arbitration to resolve employee and union grievances arising under a collective bargaining agreement. The Amalgamated Clothing Workers of America made arbitration a central element of the Protocol of Peace it negotiated with garment manufacturers in the second decade of the twentieth century. Grievance arbitration became even more popular during World War II, when most unions had adopted a no-strike pledge. The War Labor Board, which attempted to mediate disputes over contract terms, pressed for inclusion of grievance arbitration in collective bargaining agreements. The Supreme Court subsequently made labor arbitration a key aspect of federal labor policy in three cases which came to be known as the Steelworkers' Trilogy. The Court held that grievance arbitration was a preferred dispute resolution technique and that courts could not overturn arbitrators' awards unless the award does not draw its essence from the collective bargaining agreement. State and federal statutes may allow vacating an award on narrow grounds (e.g., fraud). These protections for arbitrator awards are premised on the union-management system, which provides both parties with due process. Due process in this context means that both parties have experienced representation throughout the process, and that the arbitrators practice only as neutrals. See National Academy of Arbitrators.

Securities arbitration
In the United States securities industry, arbitration has long been the preferred method of resolving disputes between brokerage firms, and between firms and their customers. The arbitration process operates under its own rules, as defined by contract. Securities arbitrations are held primarily by the Financial Industry Regulatory Authority.

The securities industry uses pre-dispute arbitration agreements, through which the parties agree to arbitrate their disputes before any such dispute arises. Those agreements were upheld by the United States Supreme Court in Shearson v. MacMahon, 482 U.S. 220 (1987) and today nearly all disputes involving brokerage firms, other than Securities class action claims, are resolved in arbitration.

The SEC has come under fire from members of the Senate Judiciary Committee for not fulfilling statutory duty to protect individual investors, because all brokers require arbitration, and arbitration does not provide a court-supervised discovery process, require arbitrators to follow rules of evidence or result in written opinions establishing precedence, or case law, or provide the efficiency gains it once did. Arbitrator selection bias, hidden conflicts of interest, and a case where an arbitration panel refused to follow instructions handed down from a judge, were also raised as issues.

Judicial arbitration
Some state court systems have promulgated court-ordered arbitration; family law (particularly child custody) is the most prominent example. Judicial arbitration is often merely advisory dispute resolution technique, serving as the first step toward resolution, but not binding either side and allowing for trial de novo. Litigation attorneys present their side of the case to an independent tertiary lawyer, who issues an opinion on settlement. Should the parties in question decide to continue to dispute resolution process, there can be some sanctions imposed from the initial arbitration per terms of the contract.

Arbitration clauses

The federal government has expressed a policy in support of arbitration clauses, because they reduce the burden on court systems to resolve disputes. This support is found in the Federal Arbitration Act, (FAA) which permits compulsory and binding arbitration, under which parties give up the right to appeal an arbitrator's decision to a court. In Prima Paint Corp. v. Flood & Conklin Mfg. Co., the U.S. Supreme Court established the "separability principle", under which enforceability of a contract must be challenged in arbitration before any court action, unless the arbitration clause itself has been challenged. Today, mandatory arbitration clauses are widespread in the United States, including by 15 of the largest 20 U.S. credit card issuers, 7 of the 8 largest cell phone companies, and 2 out of 3 major bike sharing companies in Seattle. Arbitration clauses can be enforceable if "signed" electronically, though California courts have stated that a handwritten signature to an arbitration agreement is easier to enforce than one done electronically.

The FAA has also been interpreted to preempt and invalidate state laws which prevent or discriminate against the enforcement of arbitration agreements. In one such case in 2023, which overruled California Assembly Bill 51, the Ninth Circuit Court of Appeals found that California's bill placed restrictions on the "broad national policy" favoring arbitration agreements. Similar fates have been bestowed upon legislation in New Jersey, New York, and Washington state which attempted to reduce the scope of arbitration clauses. 

In insurance law, arbitration is complicated by the fact that insurance is regulated at the state level under the McCarran–Ferguson Act. From a federal perspective, however, a circuit court ruling has determined that McCarran-Ferguson requires a state statute rather than administrative interpretations. The Missouri Department of Insurance attempted to block a binding arbitration agreement under its state authority, but since this action was based only on a policy of the department and not on a state statute, the United States district court found that the Department of Insurance did not have the authority to invalidate the arbitration agreement.

In AT&T Mobility v. Concepcion (2011), the Supreme Court of the United States upheld an arbitration clause in a consumer standard form contract which waived the right to a lawsuit and class action. However, this clause was relatively generous in that the business paid all fees unless the action was determined to be frivolous and a small-claims court action remained available; these types of protections are recommended for the contract to remain enforceable and not unconscionable.

Challenges to enforcement

Determination of validity 
Although properly drafted arbitration clauses are generally valid, they are subject to challenge in court for compliance with laws and public policy. Arbitration clauses may potentially be challenged as unconscionable and, therefore, unenforceable. Typically, the validity of an arbitration clause is decided by a court rather than an arbitrator. However, if the validity of the entire arbitration agreement is in dispute, then the issue is decided by the arbitrators in the first instance. This is known as the principle of separability. For example, in Rent-A-Center, West, Inc. v. Jackson, the Supreme Court of the United States held that "under the FAA, where an agreement to arbitrate includes an agreement that the arbitrator will determine the enforceability of the agreement, if a party challenges specifically the enforceability of that particular agreement, the district court considers the challenge, but if a party challenges the enforceability of the agreement as a whole, the challenge is for the arbitrator."

In other words, the law typically allows federal courts to decide these types of "gateway" or validity questions, but the Supreme Court ruled that since Jackson targeted the entire contract rather than a specific clause, the arbitrator decided the validity. Public Citizen, an advocacy organization opposed to the enforcement of pre-dispute arbitration agreements, characterized the decision negatively: "the court said that companies can write their contracts so that the companies' own arbitrator decides whether it's fair to submit a case to that arbitrator."

Modification of the arbitration clause 
A significant challenge to arbitrate agreements arose out of South Carolina through the case Hooters v. Phillips. In the 1999 case, a federal district court found that Hooters modified its dispute resolution rules in 1996 to be unfair enough that the court held that the agreement was unconscionable, partly due to Hooters requiring that all of the arbitrators in dispute resolution cases be selected from a list pre-approved by the company, which included Hooters managers. In April of 2022, the Court of Appeals for the Fourth Circuit found that in Coady v. Nationwide Motor Sales, because Nationwide Motor Sales' contract enabled them to be the sole party permitted to modify the contract that Coady signed. Citing Hooters v. Phillips, the court expressed when an employer has the ability “in whole or in part” to modify the arbitration provision without notice to its employees. California's Court of Appeal reached a similar conclusion in Peleg v. Neiman Marcus, in which a unilateral modification to an arbitration agreement invalidated the clause.

Waiving the right to arbitrate 
Some courts have found that parties can waive their right to compel arbitration through various forms of actions. In California, as demonstrated by Davis v. Shiekh Shoes and Espinoza v. Superior Court, a party wishing to compel arbitration though failing to pay arbitration fees in a timely manner waives their right to compel arbitration, and must resolve the dispute in court. More importantly, the Supreme Court found in Morgan v. Sundance that a party which does not compel arbitration when a valid clause exists waives its right to compel arbitration. Justice Elena Kagan, writing for the court's unanimous ruling in favor of hourly Taco Bell employee Robyn Morgan, found that the Eighth Circuit created "special rules" in which Morgan was compelled to arbitrate based on Sundance's prejudice (delay) of compelling arbitration.

Unbearable arbitration fees 
Arbitration clauses can be void in instances where the costs of arbitration would be too high. In 1999's Shankle v. B-G Maintenance Management of Colorado, Inc, the 10th Circuit Court of Appeals refused to grant a motion to compel arbitration on the basis that the fees were too high for the plaintiff Matthew Shankle. The Texas Courts of Appeals found in 2022's Cont'l Homes of Texas v. Perez that due to unaffordable arbitration costs for the plaintiffs and the arbitration agreement not being an adequate remedy for litigation.

Other challenges 
In 2014's Atalese v. U.S. Legal Services Group, L.P, the Supreme Court of New Jersey ruled that arbitration clauses must have a valid jury trial waiver, which the court saw as a constitutional right which must be explicitly waived in a contract, in order to be effective, a position reaffirmed by Pennsylvania's Superior Court in 2022's Chiluti v. Uber. 

The Federal Arbitration Act also explicitly provides that workers involved in transportation are exempt from arbitration agreements, which the Supreme Court unanimously reaffirmed in various cases,  2022's Southwest Airlines v. Saxon.

In 2023, a federal court in Delaware recommended that motions to compel arbitration which conflicted with the Employee Retirement Income Security Act of 1974 not be honored in Burnett et all v. Prudent Financial Services LLC, et all (C.A. No. 22-270-RGA-JLH). Presiding magistrate judge Jennifer Hall interpreted that based on recent action by the Supreme Court and other federal courts, not every provision within the arbitration agreement should be validated. Additionally, Judge Hall prospected that entire arbitration agreements could become invalid if a single provision is found to be unenforceable by a court.

Acts of Congress 
In 2022, the U.S. Congress passed the Ending Forced Arbitration of Sexual Assault and Sexual Harassment Act (EFASASHA), which excludes these types of complaints from arbitration clauses, including retroactively. Congress also included a ban on class action waivers for claims covered under the act. Under the law, claims which are filed after March 3, 2022 and fall under the scope of EFASASHA shall have agreements to submit disputes to binding arbitration and class action waivers within contracts signed deemed unenforceable. EFASASHA allows for claims to be submitted to binding arbitration after they are filed, however motions to compel arbitration shall be invalid. The law was championed by Gretchen Carlson, a former Fox News host sexually harassed for many years by then CEO Roger Ailes; she also opposes the use of non-disclosure agreements to shield perpetrators. Some legal agencies raised concerns that the law could allow for claims attached to a sexual harassment or sexual assault dispute to bypass arbitration as well.

Proceedings
Various bodies of rules have been developed that can be used for arbitration proceedings. The rules to be followed by the arbitrator are specified by the agreement establishing the arbitration.

Enforcement of award 

In some cases, a party may comply with an award voluntarily. However, in other cases a party will have to petition to receive a court judgment for enforcement through various means such as a writ of execution, garnishment, or lien. If the property is in another state, then a sister-state judgment (relying on the Full Faith and Credit Clause) can be received by filing to enforce the judgment in the state where the property is located.

Vacatur
Under the Federal Arbitration Act, courts can only vacate awards for limited reasons set out in statute with similar language in the state model Uniform Arbitration Act.

The court will generally not change the arbitrator's findings of fact but will decide only whether the arbitrator was guilty of malfeasance, or whether the arbitrator exceeded the limits of his or her authority in the arbitral award or whether the award was made in manifest disregard of law or conflicts with well-established public policy.

Arbitrators
Arbitrators have wide latitude in crafting remedies in the arbitral decision, with the only real limitation being that they may not exceed the limits of their authority in their award. An example of exceeding arbitral authority might be awarding relief not requested by the parties.

It is open to the parties to restrict the possible awards that the arbitrator can make. If this restriction requires a straight choice between the position of one party or the position of the other, then it is known as pendulum arbitration or final offer arbitration. It is designed to encourage the parties to moderate their initial positions so as to make it more likely they receive a favorable decision.

No definitive statement can be made concerning the credentials or experience levels of arbitrators, although some jurisdictions have elected to establish standards for arbitrators in certain fields. Some independent organizations, such as the American Arbitration Association offer arbitrator training programs, and arbitrators may cite their completion of that training as a credential. Generally speaking, however, the credibility of an arbitrator rests upon reputation, experience level in arbitrating particular issues, or expertise/experience in a particular field. Arbitrators are generally not required to be members of the legal profession.

To ensure effective arbitration and to increase the general credibility of the arbitral process, arbitrators will sometimes sit as a panel, usually consisting of three arbitrators. Often the three consist of an expert in the legal area within which the dispute falls (such as contract law in the case of a dispute over the terms and conditions of a contract), an expert in the industry within which the dispute falls (such as the construction industry, in the case of a dispute between a homeowner and his general contractor), and an experienced arbitrator.

Arbitration Fairness Act

See also
 Arbitration award
 Consumer arbitration
 Conciliation
 Dispute resolution
 Epic Systems Corp. v. Lewis
 Expert determination
 London Court of International Arbitration
 Mediation
 Negotiation
 Special referee
 Subrogation
 Tort reform
 UNCITRAL Model Law on International Commercial Arbitration
 National Arbitration Forum
 National Academy of Arbitrators
For the relevant conflict of laws elements, see contract, forum selection clause, choice of law clause, proper law, and lex loci arbitri

References

Further reading
 Jerold S. Auerbach, Justice Without Law?: Non-Legal Dispute Settlement in American History (Oxford: Oxford University Press, 1983).
 Mark J. Astarita, Esq., Introduction to Securities Arbitration (SECLaw.com, 2000 - )
 David Sherwyn, Bruce Tracey & Zev Eigen. "In Defense of Mandatory Arbitration of Employment Disputes: Saving the Baby, Tossing out the Bath Water, and Constructing a New Sink in the Process," 2 U. Pa. J. Lab. & Emp. L. 73 (1999); n.b., abbreviated source in this legal citation format is the University of Pennsylvania Journal of Labor and Employment Law, Vol. 2, p. 73.
 Ed Brunet, J.D., Arbitration Law in America: A Critical Assessment, Cambridge University Press, 2006.
 Gary Born, International Civil Litigation in United States Courts (Aspen 4th ed. 2006) (with Bo Rutledge) (3rd ed. 1996) (2nd ed. 1992) (1st ed. 1989)

External links

Read actual arbitration awards and find arbitrator's resumes at GVSU 
American Arbitration Association's Home Page
An Example of Labor Arbitration in the United States (Vulcan Iron Works and the Machinists' Union, 1981) .

United States
Law of the United States